The fifteenth season of Australian reality television series The Block premiered on August 4, 2019, on the Nine Network. Hosts Scott Cam and Shelley Craft, site foreman Keith and Dan. Along with judges Neale Whitaker, Shaynna Blaze and Darren Palmer, with guest judges William Schirripa and Roshan Abraham, who all returned from the previous season. All time Ronald McDonald champion Erin Ng joined the show for the Ronald McDonald House challenge in week 8 of the shows filming.

Production
In June 2018, it was reported that The Block producers had acquired a rundown backpackers accommodation, Oslo Hotel, at 38 Grey Street, St Kilda, through an off-market deal struck after the series approached one of the owners. The building contains five mansions hidden behind the facade. The series producers and building planners set to submit renovation plans to the City of Port Phillip council imminently. In October 2018, the Oslo Hotel was confirmed as the next location for renovation, Nine Network acquired the building for $10.8 million.

The Block’s open for inspection took place on Sunday, 20 October 2019. The Block auctions (or Block-tions) for the houses were held on Saturday, 9 November 2019, with the final episode of 2019 airing the next day on Channel Nine and 9Now at 7:00pm (ADST) on Sunday, 10 November 2019, including a 'In memory of' tribute to Peter Elliott (Peter Elliott Roofing).

Tess and Luke won the series with their house selling for over $3.6m. All houses sold on auction day with all couples profiting well over $300k.

Contestants
This is the seventh season of The Block to have five couples instead of the traditional four couples.

Score history

Weekly Room Prize

Results

Judges' scores
 Colour key:
  Highest Score
  Lowest Score

Challenge scores

Savvy Saver Award ($5,000)

Auction

Ratings

Notes
Ratings data is from OzTAM and represents the live and same day average viewership from the 5 largest Australian metropolitan centres (Sydney, Melbourne, Brisbane, Perth and Adelaide).
Mitch & Mark changed the floor plans and presented an entertaining area rather than a Master Bedroom, reducing their house to 3 bedrooms.
The original score of Andy & Deb’s 2nd Guest Bedroom was 28½, but they used a bonus point they won in the “Style a room Challenge”. Their score was changed to 29½.
As well as presenting an ensuite, Mitch & Mark also presented a kitchenette to utilise in their upstairs entertaining area.
The original score of Tess & Luke’s Studio was 28, but they used a bonus point they won in the “Challenge charity challenge”. Their score was changed to 29.
The original score of El’ise & Matt’s Rooftop Terrace/Redo Room/Garage was 29½, but they used a bonus point they won in the “obstacle course challenge”. Their score was changed to 30½. This set a record as the highest room score in Block History.

References

2019 Australian television seasons
15